Simon Laurent Nolet (born November 23, 1941) is a Canadian former professional ice hockey player. He played ten seasons in the National Hockey League (NHL), most notably for the Philadelphia Flyers. He was a member of the Philadelphia Flyers 1974 Stanley Cup-winning team, after earlier winning the 1965 Allan Cup championship of senior ice hockey with the Sherbrooke Castors.

Playing career
After a junior career with the Quebec Citadelles of the Quebec Major Junior Hockey League that saw them in the Memorial Cup playoffs, he played senior ice hockey in various leagues. His 1964 team, the Windsor Maple Leafs (of Windsor, Nova Scotia), reached the Allan Cup Eastern semi-finals, led by Nolet, who scored 68 goals in 68 games and added ten goals in the Cup playoffs. Nolet sat out most of the following season, but joined the Sherbrooke Castors for their own Allan Cup run in 1965, scoring 21 goals in 15 games to lead them to the national title.

Immediately after that, Nolet signed with the Quebec Aces of the American Hockey League, scoring two goals and an assist in his professional debut. He would star with the Aces for three more seasons and part of two others, breaking out in 1968 to lead the league in scoring with 44 goals and 52 assists for 96 points and adding 15 points in ten playoff games as the Aces reached the Calder Cup finals, a pinnacle Nolet would help them reach the following season as well.

In the meantime, however, the expansion Philadelphia Flyers of the NHL had purchased the Aces and the rights to its players in 1967. The Flyers' early years had a distinct Francophone flavor thereby, with ex-Aces Jean-Guy Gendron, André Lacroix, Serge Bernier, Rosaire Paiement, Leon Rochefort, Dick Sarrazin and Jim Johnson playing key roles with the fledgling franchise. Nolet made his NHL debut in 1968 and was a firm fixture by two seasons later, scoring 22 goals in only 56 games after his permanent promotion from Quebec and adding noteworthy two-way play and penalty killing. He was a regular in Philadelphia for four more years, earning a trip to the All-Star Game in the 1972 season.  Nolet was known for his blazing speed and heavy slapshot.

Left exposed in the 1974 NHL Expansion Draft, Nolet was selected fifth overall by the Kansas City Scouts, and was named the team's first captain. Leading a weak squad in scoring that first season, he was Kansas City's sole representative in the All-Star Game. Halfway through the next year, he was dealt to the Pittsburgh Penguins before being reacquired by the Scouts' franchise in the 1976 offseason - which had moved to Denver to become the Colorado Rockies. Once again named to his former post as team captain, Nolet played out the 1977 campaign before retiring.

Retirement
He finished his NHL career having scored 150 goals and 182 assists for 332 points in 562 games.

After Nolet's playing career was over, he worked as a scout for the Quebec Nordiques of the World Hockey Association, and later served as an assistant coach for the club from 1982 until 1987. He remains a scout in the Flyers' organization.

Achievements and facts
 Won the John B. Sollenberger Trophy as the AHL's leading scorer in 1968.
 Named to the AHL Second All-Star Team in 1968.
 Played in the NHL All-Star Game in 1972 and 1975.
 Scored the first goal in Kansas City Scouts' history, and therefore the first goal for the New Jersey Devils' franchise.
 Was on a Stanley Cup-winning team with the Flyers in 1974.

Career statistics

Regular season and playoffs

External links
 

1941 births
Canadian ice hockey right wingers
Colorado Rockies (NHL) players
French Quebecers
Ice hockey people from Quebec
Kansas City Scouts players
Living people
National Hockey League All-Stars
People from Beauce, Quebec
Philadelphia Flyers players
Philadelphia Flyers scouts
Pittsburgh Penguins players
Quebec Aces (AHL) players
Quebec Nordiques coaches
Stanley Cup champions
Canadian ice hockey coaches